Loft is a 2008 Belgian erotic mystery film directed by Erik Van Looy and written by Bart De Pauw, starring an ensemble cast of Flemish actors, led by Koen De Bouw, Filip Peeters, Bruno Vanden Broucke, Matthias Schoenaerts and Koen De Graeve.

Plot
Five married men share ownership of an upmarket loft, which they use to discreetly meet their respective mistresses. When the body of a murdered woman is found in that loft, the men begin to suspect each other of having committed the gruesome crime, as they are the only ones with keys to the premises. Through flashbacks, which are intertwined by scenes from the present, the story is unravelled.

Cast
 Koen De Bouw as Chris Van Outryve
 Filip Peeters as Vincent Stevens
 Matthias Schoenaerts as Filip Willems
  as Luc Seynaeve
 Koen De Graeve as Marnix Laureys
 Veerle Baetens as Ann Marai
  as Barbara Stevens
  as Ellen Van Outryve
  as Vicky Willems
 Wine Dierickx as Elsie Seynaeve
 Marie Vinck as Sarah Delporte
 Jan Decleir as Ludwig Tyberghein

Production

Portions of the film were shot in Ostend in January 2008. The building where the loft is situated is in Antwerp, next to the river Scheldt. A teaser trailer was released in May 2008.

Reception
By 19 February 2009, Loft was the most successful Flemish film ever at the box office with at the time 1,082,480 admissions, passing the previous record holder, Koko Flanel (1990).

Remakes

A Dutch remake of the same name was released in 2010, directed by Antoinette Beumer.

In 2011, Van Looy himself began production on a Belgian-American remake. The Loft was completed in 2014 and stars Karl Urban, James Marsden, Wentworth Miller, Eric Stonestreet and Schoenaerts reprising his role from the original film. The Loft was released theatrically on 30 January 2015.

In 2021, Netflix India announced an untitled Hindi remake of Loft directed by the director-duo Abbas Mustan, starring Sharman Joshi, Arjun Rampal and Bobby Deol. The film, later titled Penthouse, was ultimately shelved.

References

External links
 
 

2008 films
2008 crime thriller films
2000s Dutch-language films
2000s erotic thriller films
2000s mystery thriller films
2008 thriller drama films
Belgian crime thriller films
Belgian erotic thriller films
Belgian mystery thriller films
Dutch-language Belgian films
Erotic mystery films
Films directed by Erik Van Looy
Films set in Antwerp
Films shot in Antwerp